Loren Rush (born August 23, 1935) is a U.S. composer.

Biography
His works include the drone piece Hard Music (1970) for three amplified pianos. The piece features no melodic figuration but rather clouds created by only one note, the low D above cello C, repeated quickly enough by each player to be heard as nearly continuous. The surface results from the composite rhythms of percussive attacks and the interplay of partials brought out through the rhythms and fortissimo dynamics. The fifth through the ninth partials are particularly easy to hear and the louder passages feature higher partials.

In 1957, he formed an improvisation group with Terry Riley, Pauline Oliveros, Robert Erickson, and Bill Butler with a focus an aleatoric and improvisational techniques.
"

References

External links
Shere C (1973) Third Ear

20th-century classical composers
1935 births
21st-century classical composers
Living people
21st-century American composers
American male classical composers
American classical composers
20th-century American composers
20th-century American male musicians
21st-century American male musicians